Jayadeva Malla was the son of Abhaya Malla and the third Malla king of Nepal.  He started his reign after his father died in the 1255 earthquake until his death in 1258.

Reign 
The reign of Jayadeva was weak. The dynasty of Aridev Malla was slowly dying out and the local lords were growing powerful.

House of Bhonta and Tripura 
Jayasimha Malla, who was probably a local lord in Bhadgaon, had started gathering political powers during the reign of Abhaya Malla. He slowly expanded his control over the entirety of Bhadgaon. Another lord from Banepa, Jayabhimadeva also increased his influence in the surrounding regions of Banepa. The descendants of Jayasimha were called Tripuras and the descendants of Jayabhimadeva were called Bhontas.

The two houses continuously grew their influence over the valley and had, several times, direct battles against Jayadeva.

Succession 
After his death in 1258, the two houses made an agreement to alternate the throne and Jayabhimadeva became the king following the agreement. Jayadeva was the last king from the lineage of Aridev Malla.

References

Malla rulers of the Kathmandu Valley
1203 births
1258 deaths
13th-century Nepalese people
Nepalese monarchs

History of Nepal